Bateup is an English surname. Notable people with the surname include:

 Teddy Bateup (1881–1939), English footballer
 Hayley Bateup (born 1980), Australian ironwoman, surf life saver, and model
 Ashley Bateup

English-language surnames